Salif Kéïta (born 10 April 1990) is Central African international footballer who plays for AS Mangasport, primarily as a defender. He played at the 2014 FIFA World Cup qualification.

Career statistics

International

Statistics accurate as of match played 4 September 2016

International goals 
Scores and results list Central African Republic's goal tally first.

References

External links 
 

1990 births
Living people
Association football midfielders
Central African Republic footballers
Central African Republic international footballers
People from Bangui
Central African Republic expatriate footballers
Central African Republic expatriate sportspeople in Morocco
Expatriate footballers in Morocco
Central African Republic expatriate sportspeople in Algeria
Expatriate footballers in Algeria